August Verhaegen (5 August 1941 – 7 September 2012) was a Belgian racing cyclist. He rode in the 1963 Tour de France.

References

1941 births
2012 deaths
Belgian male cyclists
Place of birth missing